Georgetown Cemetery located in Georgetown, Kentucky, is the burial site of Barbara Ann Hackmann Taylor and Kentucky Governors; James F. Robinson and Joseph Desha, and Kentucky Confederate Governor George W. Johnson. Other famous politicians buried in the cemetery are James Campbell Cantrill, a Democratic nominee for Governor, and Lieutenant Governor James E. Cantrill and former Georgetown Mayor Charles Lenahan. 

Georgetown Cemetery has a Confederate Soldier Memorial dedicated to Rebel soldiers that died during the American Civil War. Soldiers inscribed on the memorial are WM. Simons, W. Hall, J.J. Hensly, WM. Sutton, Capt. John Black, WM Tanchill, Bryan Fitzpatrick, B.C. Wootten, and WM Wood. 
Other notable people buried at the cemetery are U.S. Chess Champion, Jackson Showalter and two famous artists: Will Hunleigh a landscape artist, and equine artist, Edward Troye.

It also is the burial site of a murder victim known originally as Tent Girl who was identified as Barbara Ann Hackmann Taylor in 1998.

External links

 Georgetown Cemetery page at Georgetown Kentucky web site
 

Cemeteries in Kentucky
Buildings and structures in Georgetown, Kentucky
Protected areas of Scott County, Kentucky